Achyranthes atollensis (also called atoll achyranthes or Hawaii chaff flower) was a species of plant in the family Amaranthaceae. It was endemic to the Northwestern Hawaiian Islands of Kure, Midway, Laysan and the Pearl and Hermes Atoll. Its natural habitat was sandy shores. It became extinct due to habitat loss (residential, commercial and military installation development) and the introduction of non-native species, and was last seen in 1964. It was a perennial shrub living in dry shrublands on calcareous sand and atolls.

See also
List of species of the Northwestern Hawaiian Islands

References

External links
HEAR.org Risk project: Achyranthes atollensis information
HEAR.org Risk project: Hawaiian Ecosystems website

atollensis
Endemic flora of Hawaii
Extinct flora of Hawaii
Natural history of the Northwestern Hawaiian Islands
Plant extinctions since 1500
Species endangered by habitat loss
Taxonomy articles created by Polbot
Plants described in 1980